Jawad is a village in Madhya Pradesh, India.

Jawad may also refer to:
 Jawad (name), an Arabic given name and surname (including a list of people with the name)

 Jawad (Vidhan Sabha constituency), a legislative assembly constituency of Madhya Pradesh, India
 Bin Jawad, a town in the Sirte District in Libya
 Bin Jawad District, a district in Libya from 1983 to 1987

 Javad, a Persian variant of the name

See also
 Cavad, a village and municipality in the Sabirabad Rayon of Azerbaijan
 Haji Javad Mosque, a mosque in Baku, Azerbaijan in Jasamali area
 United States v. Jawad, a Guantanamo military commission
 Javad Khanate, a khanate in the territory of modern Azerbaijan
 Javad Uyezd, an administrative unit within the Baku Governorate and Azerbaijan SSR
 Jawad (Vidhan Sabha constituency), a legislative assembly constituency of Madhya Pradesh, India
 Javad-e Seyyedi, a village in Izeh County, Khuzestan Province, Iran